H. F. C. Smith was a scholar of West African history and culture.  He was particularly interested in Arab influence in Nigeria.

Smith was one of the first historians to document the complex history of conflict between Europeans and Arabs in Nigeria.  He introduced to the west the existence of massive archives of Arabic literature and historical records in Nigeria, which he had anticipated as the natural result of "a powerful tradition of Arabic learning (which indeed persists to the present day)."   Smith argued consistently that scholarship had neglected the Arabic history of West Africa, in part because of the complexity of the historical situation and in part because of anxiety over Europe's role.  Smith taught at the University of Ibadan. He was Professor of History at Ahmadu Bello University and ran the Northern History Research Centre.

Notes
Saharan Studies Newsletter Vol. 9, No. 2 (2003), p. 6 n.3.
Smith, H. F. C. "Nineteenth-Century Arabic Archives of West Africa" (The Journal of African History, Vol. 3, No. 2 [1962], 333–336), 334.
Smith, H. F. C. "A Neglected Theme of West-African History: The Islamic Revolutions of the Nineteenth Century" (Journal of the Historical Society of Nigeria Vol. 2, No. 1. [1961], 169–185.

Year of birth missing (living people)
Living people
Historians of Africa
Academic staff of the University of Ibadan
Historians of Nigeria